Josef Wenzl (born 20 December 1984 in Zwiesel) is a German cross-country skier who has competed since 2002. He finished 31st in the individual sprint at the 2010 Winter Olympics in Vancouver, British Columbia, Canada.

Wenzl's best finish at the FIS Nordic World Ski Championships was 14th in the sprint event at Sapporo in 2007.

His only World Cup victory was in a sprint event at Düsseldorf in October 2007.

Cross-country skiing results
All results are sourced from the International Ski Federation (FIS).

Olympic Games

World Championships

World Cup

Season standings

Individual podiums
1 victory 
5 podiums

Team podiums
 1 podium – (1 )

References

External links
 

1984 births
Living people
German male cross-country skiers
Tour de Ski skiers
Cross-country skiers at the 2010 Winter Olympics
Cross-country skiers at the 2014 Winter Olympics
Olympic cross-country skiers of Germany
People from Regen (district)
Sportspeople from Lower Bavaria